Jennifer Simard (born 1970) is an American actress and singer known primarily for her work in theater.

Early life and education
Simard is from Litchfield, New Hampshire. She studied at the Boston Conservatory of Music and Hunter College.

Career

Theatre
After studying at Hunter College and the Boston Conservatory of Music, Simard moved to New York, where she appeared in Forbidden Broadway '93.

She made her Broadway debut in The 25th Annual Putnam County Spelling Bee and later performed in the Broadway productions of Shrek The Musical and Sister Act.

She received Drama Desk Award nominations for Outstanding Featured Actress in a Musical for her roles in I Love You, You're Perfect, Now Change, The Thing About Men, and Forbidden Broadway: Special Victims Unit (2005).

She originated the role of Sister Mary Downy in the 2016 Broadway musical Disaster!, for which her performance earned her a Tony Award nomination and a Drama League Award nomination in 2016. She was also nominated for a Drama Desk Award for the role, which she performed off-Broadway in 2014. The Variety reviewer wrote: "...this is a good cast that knows the comic ropes—and then some, in the special case of Jennifer Simard, who shows great comic chops as a nun with a secret gambling fixation."

She appeared on Broadway as Ernestina in the 2017 revival of Hello, Dolly!, starring Bette Midler and David Hyde Pierce.

Simard played Miss Hannigan in the St. Louis Muny production of Annie from July 18–25, 2018. A St. Louis reviewer wrote that Simard "…is nothing less than incredible in the role. She is hilarious as the head of the orphanage, causing the crowd to burst into laughter for much of her time on-stage. Her rendition of “Little Girls” is not to be missed. With impeccable comedic timing, a wonderful voice, and all-around talent, [she] gives a performance that makes it impossible to look away."

In August 2018, it was announced that Simard would join the Tony-nominated musical Mean Girls as Mrs. Heron, Ms. Norbury, and Mrs. George that September, replacing Kerry Butler. Her last performance was on December 8, 2019.

In October 2019, it was announced that Simard would join the gender-swapped revival of Company as Sarah. From February 26 to March 6, 2022, she took over the role of Joanne due to the indisposition of Patti LuPone.

Television and film
Simard has been seen on television in Younger, The Good Wife, Law & Order: Special Victims Unit, Law & Order, and The King of Queens, and also appeared in the 2000 comedy film The Flintstones in Viva Rock Vegas.

Personal life
On October 3, 2004, Simard married Brad Robertson, whom she met when he was the light board operator for the off-Broadway production of I Love You, You're Perfect, Now Change.

Theatre credits

Filmography

Film

Television

Awards and nominations

References

External links
 Official website
 
 

Living people
American musical theatre actresses
American stage actresses
People from Litchfield, New Hampshire
1970 births
21st-century American women